Shutts Copse is a   nature reserve north of West Meon in Hampshire. It is managed by the Hampshire and Isle of Wight Wildlife Trust.

This small wood has a ground layer of wild flowers, such as primroses and bluebells. There is a healthy population of dormice and birds include coal tits, tawny owls and great spotted woodpeckers.

References

Hampshire and Isle of Wight Wildlife Trust